The Florida Gators swimming and diving program represents the University of Florida in the aquatics sports of swimming and diving.  The program includes separate men's and women's teams, both of which compete in Division I of the National Collegiate Athletic Association (NCAA) and the Southeastern Conference (SEC).  The Gators host their home meets in the O'Connell Center Natatorium on the university's Gainesville, Florida campus, and are currently led by head swimming coach Anthony Nesty and diving coach Bryan Gillooly.  Since Florida's swim and dive program was established in 1930, the men's team has won forty SEC team championships and two NCAA national championships. Since the NCAA and the SEC began sanctioning women's swimming in 1981, the Lady Gators have won seventeen SEC team championships and three national championships.

Florida Gators Olympic medalists 

The University of Florida has been represented in every Summer Olympic Games since 1968, and the Gators swimming and diving program has produced over eighty-five athletes who have competed in the Olympics since the program was started.  The following is a list of former Florida swimmers, divers and coaches who won a gold (32), silver (18) or bronze (14) medal in a swimming or diving event in the Summer Olympic Games:

 Theresa Andrews, American gold medalist at 1984 Los Angeles Olympics
 Duncan Armstrong, Australian gold medalist at 1988 Seoul Olympics
 Catie Ball, American gold medalist at 1968 Mexico City Olympics
 Elizabeth Beisel, American silver and bronze medalist at 2012 London Olympics
 Greg Burgess, American silver medalist at 1992 Barcelona Olympics
 Tracy Caulkins, American gold medalist at 1984 Los Angeles Olympics
 Matt Cetlinski, American gold medalist at 1988 Seoul Olympics
 Stephen Clarke, Canadian bronze medalist at 1992 Barcelona Olympics
 Troy Dalbey, American gold medalist at 1988 Seoul Olympics
 Frédéric Delcourt, French silver medalist at 1984 Los Angeles Olympics
 Caeleb Dressel, American gold medalist at 2016 Rio Olympics and 2020 Tokyo Olympics
 Conor Dwyer, American gold medalist at 2012 London Olympics
 Geoff Gaberino, American gold medalist at 1984 Los Angeles Olympics
 Sandy Goss, Canadian silver medalist at 1984 Los Angeles Olympics; silver medalist at 1988 Seoul Olympics
 Arkady vyatchanin Russian Olympic bronze medalist at 2008
 Nicole Haislett, American gold medalist at 1992 Barcelona Olympics
 Mike Heath, American gold medalist and silver medalist at 1984 Los Angeles Olympics
 Whitney Hedgepeth, American gold and silver medalist at 1996 Atlanta Olympics
 Carlos Jayme, Brazilian bronze medalist at 2000 Sydney Olympics
 Jane Kerr, Canadian bronze medalist at 1988 Seoul Olympics
 David Larson, American gold medalist at 1984 Los Angeles Olympics
 Ryan Lochte, American gold and silver medalist at 2004 Athens Olympics; gold, silver and bronze medalist at the 2008 Beijing Olympics; gold, silver and bronze medalist at the 2012 London Olympics
 Lea Loveless, American gold and silver medalist at 1992 Barcelona Olympics
 Tim McKee, American silver medalist at 1972 Munich Olympics; silver medalist at 1976 Montreal Olympics
 Anthony Nesty, Surinamese gold medalist at 1988 Seoul Olympics; bronze medalist at 1992 Barcelona Olympics
 Mark Stockwell, Australian silver medalist and bronze medalist at 1984 Los Angeles Olympics
 Ashley Tappin, American gold medalist at 1992 Barcelona Olympics; gold medalist at 2000 Sydney Olympics
 Dara Torres, American gold medalist at 1984 Los Angeles Olympics; silver and bronze medalist at 1988 Seoul Olympics; gold medalist at 1992 Barcelona Olympics; gold and bronze medalist at 2000 Sydney Olympics; and silver medalist at 2008 Beijing Olympics
 Darian Townsend, South African gold medalist at 2004 Athens Olympics
 Rafael Vidal, Venezuelan bronze medalist at 1984 Los Angeles Olympics
 Dana Vollmer, American gold medalist at 2004 Athens Olympics; gold medalist at 2012 London Olympics
 Allison Wagner, American silver medalist at 1996 Atlanta Olympics
 Janie Wagstaff, American gold medalist at 1992 Barcelona Olympics
 Laura Walker, American bronze medalist at 1988 Seoul Olympics
 Mary Wayte, American gold medalist at 1984 Los Angeles Olympics; silver and bronze medalist at 1988 Seoul Olympics
 Paige Zemina, American bronze medalist at 1988 Seoul Olympics
 David Zubero, Spanish bronze medalist at 1980 Moscow Olympics
 Martin Zubero, Spanish gold medalist at 1992 Barcelona Olympics

For a complete list of all current and former Florida Gators swimmers and divers who were ever members of a national Olympics swimming and diving team, please see "List of University of Florida Olympians."

See also 

 Florida Gators
 History of the University of Florida
 List of University of Florida Athletic Hall of Fame members
 List of University of Florida Olympians
 University Athletic Association

References

External links 
 

 
Sports clubs established in 1930
1930 establishments in Florida